The 2016–17 All-Ireland Junior Club Hurling Championship was the 14th staging of the All-Ireland Junior Club Hurling Championship, the Gaelic Athletic Association's junior inter-county club hurling tournament. The championship began on 2 October 2016 and ended on 18 February 2017.

The All-Ireland final was played on 18 February 2017 at Croke Park in Dublin, between Mayfield from Cork and Mooncoin from Kilkenny, in what was their first ever meeting in the final. Mayfield won the match by 2-16 to 1-18 to claim their first ever championship title.

Mayfield's Nicky Kelly was the championship's top scorer with 1-43.

Results

Connacht Junior Club Hurling Championship

Connacht semi-final

Connacht final

Leinster Junior Club Hurling Championship

Leinster first round

Leinster quarter-finals

Leinster semi-finals

Leinster final

Munster Junior Club Hurling Championship

Munster quarter-finals

Munster semi-finals

Munster final

Ulster Junior Club Hurling Championship

Ulster quarter-finals

Ulster semi-finals

Ulster final

All-Ireland Junior Club Hurling Championship

All-Ireland quarter-final

All-Ireland semi-finals

All-Ireland final

Championship statistics

Top scorers

Overall

Miscellaneous

 Calry/St Joseph's became the first team to win four Connacht Championship titles.

References

All-Ireland Junior Club Hurling Championship
All-Ireland Junior Club Hurling Championship
2016